Miss Universe China 2020 was the 16th edition of the Miss Universe China pageant. Rosie Zhu Xin of Hebei crowned her successor, Jianxin Sun of Beijing at the end of the event. Jiaxin Sun represented China at Miss Universe 2020. The pageant was originally supposed to take place on March 8, 2020; however due to COVID-19 pandemic, the pageant was cancelled and postponed to a later date. The new date was December 9, 2020.

Final results

Delegates 
18 contestants competed for the title:

References

External links

2020 beauty pageants
Chinese awards
Beauty pageants in China
Miss Universe China
2020 in China
Events postponed due to the COVID-19 pandemic